A Chip Off the Old Block is an album by American jazz saxophonist Stanley Turrentine. The album features tunes associated with bandleader Count Basie, and was released by Blue Note. Music was performed by Turrentine with organist Shirley Scott, trumpeter Blue Mitchell, bassist Earl May, and drummer Al Harewood.

The CD reissue includes two alternate recordings, with Ben Dixon replacing Harewood at the drums and the addition of trombonist Tom McIntosh and saxophonist Charles Davis. The album was originally planned as a septet, but after a recording session it was decided to re-record as a slimmed-down quintet.

Reception 

The Allmusic review by Michael G. Nastos awarded the album 3½ stars and states "The spare approach of Basie is hard to ignore, and though not essential in Turrentine's discography, it is an interesting item that showcases his lighter side positively".

Track listing 
All compositions by Stanley Turrentine except as indicated

 "One O'Clock Jump" (Count Basie) – 7:51
 "Midnight Blue" (Neal Hefti) – 9:54
 "Blues in Hoss' Flat" (Basie, Frank Foster) – 6:42
 "Spring Can Really Hang You Up the Most" (Fran Landesman, Tommy Wolf) – 6:17
 "Cherry Point" (Hefti) – 6:02
 "One O'Clock Jump" [first version] (Basie) – 8:19 Bonus track on CD
 "Cherry Point" [first version] (Hefti) – 7:08 Bonus track on CD

Recorded on October 14, 1963 (6-7) and October 21, 1963 (1-5).

Personnel 
 Stanley Turrentine – tenor saxophone
 Blue Mitchell – trumpet
 Tom McIntosh – trombone (tracks 6 & 7)
 Charles Davis – baritone saxophone (tracks 6 & 7)
 Shirley Scott – organ
 Earl May – bass
 Al Harewood – drums (tracks 1–5)
 Ben Dixon – drums (tracks 6 & 7)

Production 
 Alfred Lion – producer
 Reid Miles – design
 Rudy Van Gelder – engineer
 Francis Wolff – photography

References 

1964 albums
Stanley Turrentine albums
Blue Note Records albums
Albums produced by Alfred Lion
Albums recorded at Van Gelder Studio